Terence Francisco Moore (born March 5, 1987) is a former American football linebacker. He played 8 seasons in the Arena Football League for the Spokane Shock, Orlando Predators, Cleveland Gladiators and Albany Empire.

Early life and education
Terence Moore was born on March 5, 1987, in Columbus, Georgia. He went to college at Troy State. He had 157 tackles in his college career.

Professional career

Spokane Shock
His first season was in 2012 with the Spokane Shock of the Arena Football League. He had 32 tackles and 3 interceptions. Two of his interceptions were returned for touchdowns. He also had two rushing touchdowns as a fullback. He played with the Shock until 2015, when he went to the Orlando Predators. In each of his seasons with the Shock, he had two interceptions returned for touchdowns.

Orlando Predators
From 2015 to 2016 he played with the Orlando Predators. In both seasons he was named Second-Team All-Arena.

Cleveland Gladiators
The next season he played with the Cleveland Gladiators. He had 40 tackles and 4 interceptions.

Albany Empire
His last two seasons were with the Albany Empire. In 2018, he won the Defensive Player of the Year Award. He also was named First-Team All-Arena. In 2019, he won the final ArenaBowl, ArenaBowl XXXII.

References

1987 births
Living people
Orlando Predators players
Cleveland Gladiators players
Spokane Shock players
Players of American football from Columbus, Georgia
American football linebackers
American football cornerbacks
American football fullbacks
Troy Trojans football players
Albany Empire (AFL) players